Governor Clark or Clarke may refer to:

Alonzo M. Clark (1868–1952), 16th Governor of Wyoming
Alured Clarke (1745–1832), Governor of Jamaica from 1784 to 1790
Andrew Clarke (British Army officer, born 1824) (1824–1902), 9th Governor of Straits Settlements from 1873 to 1875
Andrew Clarke (British Army officer, born 1793) (1793–1847), Governor of Western Australia from 1846 to 1847
Barzilla W. Clark (1880–1943), 16th Governor of Idaho
Charles Clark (governor) (1811–1877), 24th Governor of Mississippi
Sir Charles Clarke, 3rd Baronet (1839–1932), Governor of Malta from 1903 to 1907
Chase A. Clark (1883–1966), 18th Governor of Idaho, brother of Barzilla W. Clark
Edward Clark (governor) (1815–1880), 8th Governor of Texas
George Clarke (governor) (1676–1760), Acting Governor of the Province of New York from 1736 to 1743
George Clarke, 1st Baron Sydenham of Combe (1848–1933), Governor of Victoria from 1901 to 1903 and Governor of Bombay from 1907 to 1913
George W. Clarke (Iowa politician) (1852–1936), 21st Governor of Iowa
Henry Toole Clark (1808–1874), 36th Governor of North Carolina
James Clark (Kentucky politician) (1779–1839), 13th Governor of Kentucky
James Clarke (Iowa politician) (1812–1850), 3rd Governor of Iowa Territory
James Paul Clarke (1854–1916), 18th Governor of Arkansas
Jeremy Clarke (governor) (1605–1652), Governor of the Colony of Rhode Island and Providence Plantations in 1644 
John Clark (Delaware governor) (1761–1821), 20th Governor of Delaware
John Clark (Georgia governor) (1766–1832), 31st Governor of Georgia
Laura Clarke (fl. 2010s), Governor of the Pitcairn Islands since 2018
Myron H. Clark (1806–1892), 19th Governor of New York
Walter Eli Clark (1869–1950), 1st Governor of Alaska Territory
William Clark (1770–1838), 4th Governor of Missouri Territory
Walter Clarke (governor) (1640–1714), 6th, 13th and 17th Governor of the Colony of Rhode Island and Providence Plantations from 1676 to 1677, 1686, and 1696 to 1698